Messa (Italian for mass (liturgy)) may refer to:

 Al Messa, a daily newspaper
 Messa (Puccini), an 1880 mass
 Messa (Greece), a town in ancient Greece

See also

 Massa (disambiguation)
 Mess (disambiguation)
 Messe (disambiguation)
 Messia (disambiguation)
 Mesa (disambiguation)